Katri Rosendahl (born November 1984), is a Finnish endurance rider from Hyvinkää in southern Finland. She has been an endurance rider since the late 1990s and competed at the international level since 2003. She reached the top position in 2007 when she became the national champion for endurance riding in Finland.

References

1984 births
People from Hyvinkää
Living people
Female jockeys
Finnish jockeys
Finnish sportswomen
Sportspeople from Uusimaa